Heartless is the third full-length album by American doom metal band Pallbearer. It was released on March 24, 2017 through Profound Lore Records.

A music video was made for the track "I Saw the End".

Critical reception

Heartless was met with critical acclaim. The album received an average score of 82/100 from 13 reviews on Metacritic, indicating "universal acclaim". AllMusic writer Thom Jurek praised the album for being a maturation of Pallbearer's sound, saying that it manages to not forsake the band's origins while still breaking new ground. Writing for Exclaim!, Trystan MacDonald said, "Heartless continues to build on the band's reputation as one of the biggest acts in doom metal." In a more lukewarm review, Pitchfork contributor Andy O'Connor wrote, "The deep cauldron of metal, prog, and doom influences have so far been a key to Pallbearer's greatness, but their third record fails to piece it all together. They have run up against their limits." PopMatters writer Tanner Smith was very positive on Heartless, calling it a sign that Pallbearer will go down as one of the best metal acts of the decade.

Accolades

Track listing
All songs written and composed by Pallbearer.

Personnel
Pallbearer
 Brett Campbell – guitar, vocals, synthesizers
 Mark Lierly – percussion
 Joseph D. Rowland – bass, backing vocals, synthesizers
 Devin Holt – guitar, backing vocals

Additional personnel
 Jason Weinheimer – engineering
 Zach Reeves – engineering
 Dave Collins – mastering
 Michael Lierly – artwork
 Joe Barresi – mixing

Charts

References

2017 albums
Pallbearer (band) albums
Profound Lore Records albums